Diktatūra (meaning "The dictatorship") is  a patriotic metal band from Lithuania. Most of their lyrics feature topics such as fatherland, honor, war, patriotism and Lithuanian traditions.

The band formed in the mid-1990s, and at first played far right songs;  some were about football hooliganism and white power skinheads. The first members had pseudonyms: Slibinas (Dragon), Kaminas (Chimney) and Indėnas (Indian). These members recorded two albums, Metas (1996) and TvarkOi! (1997). The third album was recorded by four musicians, of which only Slibinas remained from the first lineup. Eventually their song lyrics became less radical; mostly about patriotism, war, honour, traditions and culture, but also about beer and street fighting. Some songs, especially from the album Kitokios Dainos (2003), are not related to these subjects. A few years later Diktatura became a simple patriotic rock/metal band.

Discography

Metas, 1996 (Time)
No CD version, only MC.
Guitar, vocal - Slibinas
Bass, vocal - Kaminas
Drums - Indėnas

TvarkOi!, 1997 (In Order!)
No CD version, only MC.
Guitar, vocal - Slibinas
Bass, vocal - Kaminas
Drums - Indėnas

Tuzinas, 1998 (Dozen)
Guitar, vocal - Pinčiukas
Bass - Gedukas
Guitar - Slibinas
Drums - Kurmis

Mūsų - Jūsų, 2000 (Ours - Yours)
Guitar, vocal - Pinčiukas
Bass - Gedukas
Drums - Noreika

Pasaulis Apsivers, 2001 (The world will turn upside down)
Guitar, vocal - Pinčiukas
Bass - Gedukas
Drums - Šiaulys

Žemė, 2003 (The land)
Guitar, vocal - Pinčiukas
Bass - Gedukas
Drums - Noreika

Kitokios Dainos, 2003 (Different Songs)
Guitar, vocal - Pinčiukas
Bass - Gedukas
Drums - Noreika

Baltai, 2004 (Balts)
Guitar, vocal - Pinčiukas
Guitar, another vocal - Kaminas
Bass - Gedukas
Drums - Mažius

Lietuvai, 2006 ("For Lithuania")
 Guitar, vocal - Pinčiukas
 Guitar,  - Kaminas
 Bass - Čeburas                      
 Drums - Sakalas
 Arunas Kibartas - smuikas

Neliksim užmiršti, 2008 (We won't be forgotten)
 Pinčiukas - Guitar, vocal
 Kaminas   - Guitar, vocal
 Čeburas   - Bass guitar, vocal, baroque flute (recorder)                  
 Sakalas   - Drums

External links
 
 Diktatūra at MySpace

Lithuanian heavy metal musical groups